The Thirteen Buddhist Sites of Iyo（伊予十三仏霊場, Iyo jūsan butsu reijō）are a group of fifteen Buddhist sacred sites in Ehime Prefecture dedicated to the Thirteen Buddhas. (Iyo Province was the former name of Ehime Prefecture on Shikoku Island.) The majority of the temples in this grouping are part of Japanese esoteric Shingon Buddhism. Several temples are also included in the Shikoku 88 temple pilgrimage.

Directory

See also
 Thirteen Buddhas

External links 
 

Buddhist temples in Ehime Prefecture
Buddhist pilgrimage sites in Japan